Parliamentary elections were held in Colombia on 16 March 1958 to elect the Senate and Chamber of Representatives. They were the first elections held under the National Front agreement, which only allowed the Conservative Party and the Liberal Party to contest the elections, and allocated 50% of the seats in both houses to each party. As a result, the main contest at the elections was between factions within each party.

Results

Senate

Chamber of Representatives

References

Parliamentary elections in Colombia
Colombia
1958 in Colombia